Georges Bregy (born 17 January 1958, in Raron) is a retired Swiss football striker and midfielder.

He was capped 54 times and scored 12 goals for the Swiss national team between 1984 and 1994. He played four games at the 1994 FIFA World Cup, and scored a free kick goal against the United States.

Bregy won the top goalscorer title in Switzerland in 1984, having scored 21 goals during the season.

He coached Raron, Lausanne, Thun, Zürich and Stäfa.

References

1958 births
Living people
Swiss men's footballers
Switzerland international footballers
1994 FIFA World Cup players
BSC Young Boys players
FC Zürich managers
FC Martigny-Sports players
FC Lausanne-Sport players
FC Sion players
Swiss Super League players
Swiss football managers
FC Lausanne-Sport managers
FC Thun managers
Swiss-French people
Association football forwards